Mitzie Jacquelin Hunter  (born September 14, 1971) is a politician in Ontario, Canada. She is a Liberal member of the Legislative Assembly of Ontario who was first elected in a by-election on August 1, 2013 and later re-elected in the elections of 2014 and 2018. She represents the Toronto riding of Scarborough—Guildwood. She served as a member of cabinet in the government of Kathleen Wynne. She was a candidate for the 2020 Ontario Liberal Party leadership election, having placed fourth place with 5.7% of the ballot.

Background
Hunter and her family immigrated to Canada from Jamaica in 1975. She grew up in Scarborough, graduated from the University of Toronto with a BA, and completed her MBA from the Rotman School of Management.

She was CEO of the Greater Toronto CivicAction Alliance, and was previously CAO of Toronto Community Housing. She also served as Vice President at Goodwill Industries of Toronto.

Politics
In 2013 she ran as the Liberal candidate in a by-election called to replace Margarett Best who resigned due to health reasons. She defeated Progressive Conservative candidate Ken Kirupa by 1,246 votes. She faced Kirupa again in 2014 this time defeating him by 7,610 votes.

In June 2014, she was appointed as an Associate Minister for the Ministry of Finance responsible for the Ontario Retirement Pension Plan. On June 13, 2016, she was promoted to the senior position of Minister of Education.

On January 17, 2018, it was announced that Ms. Hunter would leave her position as Minister of Education to replace outgoing Deb Matthews as the new Minister of Advanced Education and Skills Development.

On August 14, 2019, Hunter announced her candidacy for the 2020 Ontario Liberal Party leadership race. At the leadership convention on March 7, 2020, she finished fourth. She was re-elected in the 2022 Ontario general election.

Cabinet positions

Electoral record

References

External links 
 
 

1971 births
Black Canadian politicians
Black Canadian women
Women government ministers of Canada
Jamaican emigrants to Canada
Living people
Members of the Executive Council of Ontario
Ontario Liberal Party MPPs
People from Scarborough, Toronto
Politicians from Toronto
Women MPPs in Ontario
University of Toronto alumni
21st-century Canadian politicians
21st-century Canadian women politicians